Arnie Stuthman (born June 25, 1941) is an American politician, farmer, and livestock feeder. He is a former member of the unicameral Nebraska Legislature and resides in Platte Center, Nebraska.  

Personal life
Stuthman was born in Colfax County, Nebraska and graduated from Columbus High School in 1959.  He was a former member of the U.S. Air National Guard, chairman or president of many agricultural organizations. He currently is the chairman of the Platte County supervisors, board of directors of the Columbus Area Chamber of Commerce and a member of Christ Lutheran Church.
He has 4 children: Jeff Todd Amy and Eric. He has 8 grandchildren Christopher, Tony, Hannah, Hillary, Trey, Mitchell, Blair, Will, and Hailee.

State legislature
Stuthman was elected in 2002 to represent the 22nd Nebraska legislative district.  He sat on the Committee On Committees; Developmental Disabilities Special Investigative Committee; Health and Human Services; Legislative Performance Audit; Midwest Interstate Passenger Rail Compact Commission; and Transportation and Telecommunications committees.

See also

 Nebraska Legislature

References
 
 

1941 births
County supervisors and commissioners in Nebraska
Living people
Republican Party Nebraska state senators
American Lutherans